The St. Louis Illusion were an American arena soccer team founded in 2008.  The team disbanded in 2010.

The team was a charter member of the Professional Arena Soccer League (PASL-Pro), the first division of arena (indoor) soccer in North America. They won the 2008-09 United States Open Cup for Arena Soccer, the first tournament in the series.

Arena
 Dellwood Indoor Soccer Arena (2010)
 The Game Arena in Glen Carbon, Illinois (2008–2010)

Roster
As of December 7, 2008

Year-by-year

Awards and honors
2008-09 United States Open Cup for Arena Soccer champions

Playoff record

External links
 Official website
 PASL general website
 PASL-Pro website

Madison County, Illinois
I
I
Defunct Professional Arena Soccer League teams
Indoor soccer clubs in the United States
Defunct indoor soccer clubs in the United States
2008 establishments in Missouri
2010 disestablishments in Missouri
Association football clubs established in 2008
Association football clubs disestablished in 2010